Jaimin Jolliffe (born 7 November 1996) is an  international rugby league footballer who plays as a  for the Gold Coast Titans in the NRL.

Early life
Jolliffe played his junior rugby league for Wagga Wagga Kangaroos. He is of Northern Irish descent through his Grandparents.

Playing career
Jolliffe made his debut in round 1 of the 2020 NRL season for the Gold Coast against the Canberra Raiders starting from the bench.
Jolliffe played all 25 matches for the Gold Coast in the 2021 NRL season including the club's elimination final loss against the Sydney Roosters.
Jolliffe played 19 games for the Gold Coast in the 2022 NRL season as the club finished 13th on the table.

References

External links
Gold Coast Titans profile
Ireland profile

1996 births
Living people
Australian rugby league players
Gold Coast Titans players
Ireland national rugby league team players
Rugby league players from Wagga Wagga
Rugby league props